{{Automatic taxobox
| image = Magnaporthe grisea.jpg
| image_caption = Magnaporthe grisea
| taxon = Magnaporthales
| authority = Thongk., Vijaykr. & K.D. Hyde 2009
| subdivision_ranks = Families
| subdivision = 
Ceratosphaeriaceae (1)
Magnaporthaceae (24)
Ophioceraceae (2)
Pseudohalonectriaceae (1)
Pyriculariaceae (11)
}}

The Magnaporthales''' are an order of fungi within the class Sordariomycetes.

Wijayawardene et al. in 2020 added more families and genera to the order.

References

External links

 
Ascomycota orders